Katie Chonacas is an American actress.

Chonacas was born in Detroit, Michigan. After moving to Los Angeles in 2002 she landed roles on television series including CSI: NY, It's Always Sunny In Philadelphia, Cold Case and CSI: Crime Scene Investigation.  She had supporting roles in Major Movie Star as Amber, Thick as Thieves as June, and Bad Lieutenant: Port of Call New Orleans as Tina.

Acting
Chonacas moved to Los Angeles in 2002, where her acting career expanded. She landed roles on top television series such as CBS’s CSI: New York and FX Network’s It’s Always Sunny in Philadelphia. She also excelled in film as she booked supporting roles in the films Major Movie Star starring Jessica Simpson and The Code starring Morgan Freeman and Antonio Banderas. She also shared a passionate scene with Nicolas Cage in Bad Lieutenant: Port of Call New Orleans directed by Werner Herzog who hand-selected Chonacas for the role. She has also starred in several major music videos. Her first lead in a music video was playing a young teenage hippie in the Chemical Brothers song The Golden Path. She was chosen out of a large L.A. talent pool to be the lead in Pink’s music video Who Knew, directed by Dragon. She was also featured wearing Gucci in Hilary Duff’s music video Stranger.

Influences
One of Chonacas' mentors is long-time friend Steve Valentine, whom she met on her first acting gig on the Universal Studios lot for the NBC TV show Crossing Jordan, on which Valentine starred.

References

Interview: Katie Chonacas Talks Streets of Blood
http://www.maxim.com/girls/girls-of-maxim/44950/katie-chonacas.html
IGN
http://www.behindthehype.com/interviews/actress-katie-chonacas/
http://talkingmakeup.com/celebrity-beauty-style/beauty-news/meet-katie-chonacas-hollywoods-next-starlet/
Actress Katie Chonacas Appears In Action Thriller Film Streets Of Blood To Be Released Worldwide July 28, 2009
Larry Leight on working with Katie Chonacas
Podcast Interview: Katie Chonacas NFT Artist & Actor

External links
 
 

American film actresses
Actresses from Michigan
Female models from California
Living people
Female models from Michigan
American people of Greek descent
21st-century American singers
21st-century American women singers
Year of birth missing (living people)